Mizuho Ishida (石田瑞穂 Ishida Mizuho, born January 22, 1988) is a former Japanese volleyball player who played for Hisamitsu Springs, Denso Airybees, Takefuji Bamboo, and the Japan women's national volleyball team.

Clubs
  Takasaki University of Commerce High School
  Takefuji Bamboo(2006–2009)
  Hisamitsu Springs (2009-2015)
  Denso Airybees (2015-2019)

National team
  National team (2009-)

Awards

Individual 
2011-2012 V.Premier League - Excellent player award, Best 6.

Team 
 2011-2012 V.Premier League -  Runner-Up, with Hisamitsu Springs.
 2012 - Empress's Cup -  Champion, with Hisamitsu Springs.
 2012-2013 V.Premier League -  Champion, with Hisamitsu Springs.
 2013 - Japan-Korea V.League Top Match -  Champion, with Hisamitsu Springs.
 2013 - Kurowashiki All Japan Volleyball Tournament -  Champion, with Hisamitsu Springs.
 2014 Asian Club Championship -  Champion, with Hisamitsu Springs.

National team 
2010 World Championship - Bronze medal
2011 Montreux Volley Masters -  Champion

References

External links
 FIVB Biography

Living people
1988 births
Japanese women's volleyball players